This is a list of the diplomatic missions (including embassies, high commissions and Apostolic Nunciatures) in Ottawa, Ontario, Canada.

Diplomatic missions in Ottawa

Countries without an embassy in Ottawa

 Andorra, U.N. Mission in New York City covers Canada
 Angola, embassy in Washington D.C. covers Canada
 Bahrain, embassy in Washington D.C. covers Canada
 Belize, embassy in Washington, D.C. covers Canada, has honorary consuls in Calgary and Vancouver
 Bhutan, U.N. Mission in New York City covers Canada, has an honorary consul in Toronto
 Botswana, embassy in Washington D.C. covers Canada, has an honorary consul in Ottawa
 Cambodia, U.N. Mission in New York City covers Canada
 Cape Verde, embassy in Washington D.C. covers Canada
 Central African Republic, embassy in Washington D.C. covers Canada
 Comoros, U.N. Mission New York City cover Canada, has an honorary consul in Burlington
 Republic of Congo, embassy in Washington D.C. covers Canada, has an honorary consul in Toronto
 Djibouti, embassy in Washington D.C. covers Canada, has a consulate in Montreal
 Equatorial Guinea, U.N. Mission in New York City cover Canada
 Eritrea, embassy in Washington D.C. covers Canada, has a consulate in Toronto
 Fiji, embassy in Washington D.C. covers Canada
 Gambia, embassy in Washington D.C. covers Canada
 Guinea Bissau, U.N. Mission in New York City cover Canada
 Iran, Interest Section of Iran through the embassy of Pakistan in Washington D.C. covers Canada
 North Korea, U.N. Mission in New York City covers Canada
 Kyrgyzstan, embassy in Washington D.C. covers Canada, has a consulate in Ottawa
 Laos, embassy in Washington D.C. covers Canada, has an honorary consul in Vancouver
 Liberia, embassy in Washington D.C. covers Canada
 Luxembourg, embassy in Washington D.C. covers Canada, has honorary consuls in Ottawa, Toronto, Montreal, Calgary and Vancouver
 Malawi, embassy in Washington D.C. covers Canada
 Maldives, U.N. Mission in New York City covers Canada
 Malta, embassy in Washington D.C. covers Canada, has a consulate general in Toronto, and honorary consuls in Montreal, St. John's, Ottawa, and Vancouver
 Marshall Islands, embassy in Washington D.C. covers Canada
 Mauritania, U.N. Mission in New York City covers Canada; has honorary consuls in Montreal and Edmonton
 Mauritius, embassy in Washington D.C. covers Canada, has honorary consuls in Montreal, Ottawa, Toronto and Vancouver
 Monaco, embassy in Washington D.C. covers Canada, has honorary consuls general in Montreal, Toronto and an honorary consul in Vancouver
 Montenegro, embassy in Washington D.C. covers Canada, has an honorary consul in Vancouver
 Mozambique, embassy in Washington D.C. covers Canada
 Namibia, embassy in Washington D.C. covers Canada, has an honorary consul in Waterloo, Ontario
 Nicaragua, embassy in Washington D.C. covers Canada, has an honorary consul in Whitby, Ontario
 Niger, embassy in Washington D.C. covers Canada
 Oman, embassy in Washington D.C. covers Canada
 Papua New Guinea, embassy in Washington D.C. covers Canada, has an honorary consul in Toronto
 Samoa, U.N. representatives in New York City cover Canada
 San Marino, U.N. representatives in New York City cover Canada
 São Tomé and Príncipe, embassy in Washington D.C. covers Canada
 Seychelles, U.N. representatives in New York City cover Canada, has a consulate in Montreal
 Sierra Leone, embassy in Washington D.C. covers Canada, has a consulate in Ottawa
 Singapore, High Commissioner is located at the Ministry of Foreign Affairs in Singapore, has honorary consuls in Toronto and Vancouver
 Solomon Islands, U.N. Mission in New York City covers Canada, has an honorary consul in Vancouver
 Somalia, U.N. Mission in New York City covers Canada
 Suriname, embassy in Washington D.C. covers Canada, has honorary consuls in Toronto and Kelowna, British Columbia
 Swaziland, embassy in Washington D.C. covers Canada
 Republic of China (Taiwan), the Taipei Economic and Cultural Office in Canada in Ottawa serves as the de facto embassy
 Tajikistan, U.N. Mission in New York City cover Canada
 Tonga, U.N. Mission in New York City covers Canada
 Tuvalu, U.N. Mission in New York City covers Canada
 Turkmenistan, embassy in Washington D.C. covers Canada
 Uzbekistan, embassy in Washington D.C. covers Canada

See also

 List of diplomatic missions in Canada
 1985 Turkish embassy attack in Ottawa

References 

 Foreign Affairs and Trade Canada: Diplomatic missions in Ottawa

 
Foreign relations of Canada
Ottawa-related lists
Canada diplomacy-related lists
Canada